The first edition of the Women's Hockey Tournament at the Commonwealth Games took place at the Bukit Jalil Stadium, during the 1998 Commonwealth Games in Kuala Lumpur, Malaysia. The event started on Wednesday September 9 and ended on Sunday September 20.

Participating nations

Results
All times local (UTC +8).

Preliminary round

Pool A

Pool B

Classification round

Semi-finals

Bronze-medal match

Gold-medal match

Statistics

Final standings

References

Fieldhockey Canada

1998
Women's tournament
1998 in women's field hockey
1998 Commonwealth Games - Women's tournament